Gerry Tansey (born 15 October 1933) is an English retired footballer who played as a winger in the English Football League for Tranmere Rovers.

References

Tranmere Rovers F.C. players
Everton F.C. players
Association football wingers
English Football League players
1933 births
Living people
English footballers
Footballers from Liverpool